Togari is a rural locality in the local government area (LGA) of Circular Head in the North-west and west LGA region of Tasmania. The 2016 census recorded a population of 97 for the state suburb of Togari.

History 
The locality was gazetted as Montagu Swamp in 1957, and re-gazetted as Togari in 1965. Togari had been used as a parish name since the 1890s. It is believed to be an Aboriginal word for “summit” or “crown”. 

The area was used as a soldier settlement.

Geography
The Arthur River forms most of the southern boundary. The Montagu River flows through from east to north-west and then forms part of the western boundary.

Road infrastructure 
Route A2 (Bass Highway) runs through from east to west.

References

Towns in Tasmania
Localities of Circular Head Council